Greatest Hits is a compilation album released by British hip hop group Blazin' Squad. The album was released digitally via 7digital.com on 22 June 2009. The album failed to chart on the UK Albums Chart.

Background
Following the group's split in late 2004, four of the original band members decided to continue writing and recording, and in 2006, they signed a deal with Peach Records, got in contact with their previous songwriters and released a comeback single, "All Night Long". The comeback was not successful, and "All Night Long" failed to chart. The group were subsequently dropped from the label. In 2008, after recruiting another of the original band members, the five-piece signed a deal with Naughty Boy Records and released a further comeback single, "Let's Start Again". This single performed worse than All Night Long, and the group were subsequently dropped again. Their contract with Naughty Boy licensed them to release an album - and subsequently, a greatest hits compilation, containing all of the group's singles, as well as some b-sides and remixes, was released.

Track listing
 Side A - The Best Blazin'
 "Crossroads" (Isley / Jasper / McCane / Scruggs / Henderson / Howse) - 3:50 from In the Beginning
 "Love On The Line" (Ballard / Ballard / Murray) - 3:45 from In the Beginning
 "Reminisce" (Blazin' Squad / Bandawe / McLeod / Campbell) - 4:03 from In the Beginning
 "Where The Story Ends" (Blazin' Squad / Stannard / Gallagher / Morgan) - 4:40 from In the Beginning
 "We Just Be Dreamin'" (Blazin' Squad / Murray / Ballard / Ingoldsby / Thompson) - 3:28 from Now or Never
 "Flip Reverse" (Blazin' Squad / Murray / Ballard / Vaughan / Mhondera) - 2:55 from Now or Never
 "Here 4 One" (Blazin' Squad / Murray / Ballard / Vaughan / Mhondera) - 4:33 from Now or Never
 "Baby Goodbye" (Perry / Thomas / Chinn / Murray / McKenzie / Omar) - 3:39 from Times Like These
 "One More Night Alone" (Wilkins / Hubert / Eyre) - 3:59 from Times Like These
 "All Night Long" (Blazin' Squad / Murray / Ballard / Mhondera / Mhondera) - 3:02 Previously unreleased
 "Let's Start Again" (Blazin' Squad / Murray / Ballard / Mhondera) - 3:44 Previously unreleased

 Side B - The Rare Blazin'
 "How Blazin' Rolls" (Blazin' Squad / Bandawe / McLeod) - 3:41 from Reminisce/Where the Story Ends EP
 "Whoa!" (Blazin' Squad / Hubert) - 2:56 from All Night Long EP
 "Bounce" (Blazin' Squad / Bandawe / McLeod) - 4:55 from Love on the Line EP
 "Revolution" (Blazin' Squad / Marc Bolan) - 2:53 from Now or Never
 "Life's A Struggle" (Blazin' Squad / Thanh / Newsky / Krishan) - 3:39 from Now or Never
 "Joanna" (Blazin' Squad / Bell / Bell / Brown / Thomas / Adams) - 4:43 Previously unreleased
 "Love On The Line" (Incident Mix) (Ballard / Ballard / Murray) - 3:45 Previously unreleased
 "We Just Be Dreamin'" (Vocal Version) (Blazin' Squad / Murray / Ballard / Ingoldsby / Thompson) - 3:37 from We Just Be Dreamin' EP
 "Let's Start Again" (Remix Featuring Bashy & Chipmunk) (Blazin' Squad / Murray / Ballard / Mhondera / Bashy / Chipmunk) - 4:01 from Let's Start Again EP

References

2009 greatest hits albums
Blazin' Squad albums